The three stars in ice hockey are the three best players in a game as chosen by a third party, with the first star considered the best of the three players, akin to the player of the match in other sports. Usually, the top point scorers or outstanding goaltenders are designated as the three best players (or stars) of the game, but other players may be considered by affecting the game by other means (e.g. consistent physical play, many steals, blocked shots, etc.).

Usage 
Three stars were first awarded in the 1936–37 NHL season as a means for Imperial Oil (Hockey Night in Canadas then new principal sponsor) to advertise its “Three Star” brand of gasoline. In addition, it was seen as a way to promote the game's best stars of the time. After the sponsorship ended in 1976, the tradition remained on the Canadian Broadcasting Corporation's flagship hockey show.

The usage of three stars has since expanded greatly. All professional hockey teams (or radio/television broadcasts of those teams) in North America award three stars at the end of each game, and many amateur and collegiate leagues (or broadcasts of their games) do as well. The National Hockey League awards three stars during every game, in both the regular season and Stanley Cup Playoffs, and not just limited to those shown on HNIC. Media representatives of the home team make the selections. It also awards a nightly set of three stars, which are the three best players out of all who played a game in the league on a given night. Also, in the 2007–08 NHL season, the previous awards of “Offensive Player of the Week” and “Defensive Player of the Week” were replaced by the “Three Stars of the Week”, while the similar awards of “Offensive Player of the Month” and “Defensive Player of the Month” were replaced by the “Three Stars of the Month”.

The NHL also has a system which awards points to its nightly three stars: 30 points to the first star, 20 points to the second, and 10 to the third. It keeps a running tally of the number of points each player has been awarded . NHL teams may use these standings; for example, the Vancouver Canucks award a sum to a charity chosen by its player who earned the highest number of points that month. The Molson Cup is also awarded to the top point-earner of the year of each Canadian team.

Despite its popularity in North America, three stars are generally not awarded during international play, such as at the Winter Olympic Games. The IIHF World Championships and World Junior Championships instead issue awards such as "Best Player" for each team per game, or the overall best player per position over the course of the tournament.

Unusual selections 
The three star selections for a game, being a "fun" statistic, do not ordinarily affect any other aspect of the game. As such, there have been instances in which the three stars have been awarded in an unexpected way, often to recognize a single player's accomplishments.

On occasion, a player has been awarded all three stars, or a star has been given to non-players, such as the crowd in attendance.

To honor his final game as the long-time broadcaster for the Chicago Blackhawks, Pat Foley was named the number one star of the Hawks' game against San Jose on April 14, 2022.

See also 
 NHL All-Star team
 Toyota Cup, an award for Philadelphia Flyers players
 Molson Cup, an award for players on Canadian hockey teams

Notes and references 

Ice hockey terminology